The South Dakota State Jackrabbits baseball team is the varsity intercollegiate baseball program of South Dakota State Jackrabbits in Brookings, South Dakota, United States. The program's first season was in 1947, and it has been a member of the NCAA Division I Summit League since the start of the 2008 season. Its home venue is Erv Huether Field, located on South Dakota State's campus. Rob Bishop is the team's head coach starting in the 2017 season. The program has appeared in 1 NCAA Tournaments at the Division I level, while making 8 at the Division II level. It has won 1 conference tournament championships and 1 regular season conference titles. As of the start of the 2018 Major League Baseball season, 5 former Jackrabbits has appeared in Major League Baseball.

History

Early history 
The program's first season of play was 1947.

Conference affiliations 
 North Central Conference (1958–2004)
 Independent (2005–2007)
 Summit League (2008–present)

Erv Huether Field 

Erv Huether Field was also the name (from 1974 to 2001) of the Jackrabbit baseball program's home from 1958 to 2001. The old Erv Huether Field was demolished in 2001. From 2001 to 2007, the program played at Bob Shelden Field, a municipal venue in Brookings.

In the spring of 2006, construction began on the present Erv Huether Field. Walls were completed in 2007, and batting cages and dugouts were added in the spring of 2008. On April 21, 2008, the new facility opened with a game against Presentation (SD), which South Dakota State won 22-3. In 2012, permanent seating was added, increasing the capacity for the stadium to 600.  A new pressbox was added to the stadium also.

Head coaches 
Erv Huether, for whom the venue is named, coached the South Dakota State baseball program for 34 seasons, from 1950 to 1983. His overall record was 352–376–2, and he was awarded several accolades, including a 1984 induction into the American Baseball Coaches Association Hall of Fame.

NCAA tournaments
South Dakota State's NCAA Tournament History

Notable former players 
Below is a list of notable former Jackrabbits and the seasons in which they played for South Dakota State.

 Jerry Crider
 Vean Gregg
 Layne Somsen
 Caleb Thielbar
 Blake Treinen

See also 
 List of NCAA Division I baseball programs

References

External links